The 1975 Wichita State Shockers football team was an American football team that represented  Wichita State as a member of the Missouri Valley Conference (MVC) during the 1975 NCAA Division I football season. In their second year under head coach Jim Wright, the team compiled an overall record of 3–8 with a mark of 1–3 in conference play, tying for fourth place in the MVC.

Schedule

References

Wichita State
Wichita State Shockers football seasons
Wichita State Shockers football